Carlo Lorenzi (born 2 September 1974) is an Italian ice hockey player. He competed in the men's tournament at the 2006 Winter Olympics.

References

External links
 

1974 births
Living people
Olympic ice hockey players of Italy
Ice hockey players at the 2006 Winter Olympics
Sportspeople from the Province of Belluno